Crioceras is the scientific name for two genera of organisms and may refer to:
 Crioceras (cephalopod), a prehistoric genus of ammonites in the family Crioceratidae
 Crioceras (plant), a genus of plants in the family Apocynaceae